Petar Kružić stairway, or Petar Kružić staircase, or Trsat stairway is the stone stairway in Rijeka (Croatia) that leads from Rijeka to Trsat.

The stairway starts from the archway at the Eastern Bank of Rječina river in Rijeka, and leads up to Trsat settlement, which placed on a plateau with altitude of 138 meters from sea level. The stairway consists 561 stone steps and was built for the pilgrims as the road to the Church of Our Lady of Trsat (Church of Our Lady of Trsat).

The construction of the votive stairway was begun in 1531. due to the Croatian warlord captain (Petar Kružić), who excelled in the battles with the Turks. Petar Kružić built the lower part of the staircase way leading to the Basilica of Notre-Dame of Trsat, today is Church of Our Lady of Trsat dated 15th century. It is why this staircase was named Petar Kružić stairway.

Later the stairway was extended up to 561 steps.

One of the votive chapels along this stairway was created in 15th century and another one in 18th century.

The baroque chapel and legend

The porch at the foot of the stairway leading to Trsat has a statue of "Virgin with Child" dating from 1745.
There is a legend about the Trsat stairway. It says that the Franciscans made a deal with the Devil: if he makes a stairway, he will have a soul who climbs the stairway first. After some deliberation, the Devil accepted. Once he finished the work, the Devil waited for the victim. However, the Franciscans let a goat climb the stairway. The Devil was so enraged that he mixed the steps, so that nobody had been able to count them to this day! The legend  is based on the fact that the stairway was extended on several occasions. When it was first built in 1531 by Petar Kružić, the captain of the Uskoks, there were about a hundred steps. Today, their number exceeds 500.
The beginning of the steep ascent as votive repositories of dignitaries.

A unique experience is to climb the Trsat steps in the procession on the Feast of the Assumption. Even today, some pilgrims practise the ancient votive tradition of climbing the steps on their knees.

References 
 Službene stranice Grada Rijeke (24. veljače 2010.)
 Jeanne Oliver, Croatia, pg. 97-98, Lonely Planet Publications, 4th ed. (2007), 

Buildings and structures in Rijeka
Pedestrian infrastructure in Croatia
Staircase
Stairways
Trsat
Transport in Primorje-Gorski Kotar County